Prosoparia perfuscaria, the inornate prosoparia moth, is a moth in the family Erebidae described by Augustus Radcliffe Grote in 1883. It is found in North America.

The MONA or Hodges number for Prosoparia perfuscaria is 8419.

References

Further reading
Arnett, Ross H. (2000). American Insects: A Handbook of the Insects of America North of Mexico. CRC Press.
 Lafontaine, J. Donald, & Schmidt, B. Christian (2010). "Annotated check list of the Noctuoidea (Insecta, Lepidoptera) of North America north of Mexico". ZooKeys, vol. 40, 1-239.

External links
Butterflies and Moths of North America

Moths described in 1883